is a video game that was published in 1992 by Telenet Japan and developed by their Wolfteam subsidiary. It was released on the NEC PC-98 in the same year. The game was later ported to the Super Famicom in 1994. Its subtitle could be translated as "Legend of the Scarlet King".

The main character of Hiouden is Richard A. MacIntyre, the titular Scarlet King. His castle has been taken over by the Macaulays, and everyone in the castle was executed except him. He fled to the hanging gardens in the castle to regroup. There he discovers Beatrix, a dryad, who grants him the ability to summon demons. Thus begins his quest to retake his home.

The game can be played using the SNES mouse or a normal controller.

Music
The game's music was composed by Motoi Sakuraba, Hiroya Hatsushiba and Shinji Tamura. Hatsushiba was also the sound programmer.

Trivia
 This game is also noted as Yoshiharu Gotanda's first work as the lead programmer.
 It is the second to last game Wolfteam developed before the big staff breakup.
 Richard A. MacIntyre makes a cameo appearance in Harmel Village in the game Tales of Phantasia as the city mayor and store owner.

References

1992 video games
NEC PC-9801 games
Super Nintendo Entertainment System games
Japan-exclusive video games
Telenet Japan games
Video games developed in Japan
Video games scored by Motoi Sakuraba
Video games set in castles